Hyde Park Presbyterian Church is a historic church at 3915 Ave. B in Austin, Texas.

It was built in 1896 and added to the National Register in 1990.

References

Churches in Austin, Texas
Churches on the National Register of Historic Places in Texas
Churches completed in 1896
19th-century Presbyterian church buildings in the United States
National Register of Historic Places in Austin, Texas
1896 establishments in Texas